Anarsia acrotoma is a moth of the family Gelechiidae. It was described by Edward Meyrick in 1913. It is found in southern India.

The forewings are light greyish ochreous, irrorated (sprinkled) with whitish and with a few scattered fuscous and blackish scales, as well as a short black dash beneath the costa near the base. There is a triangular blackish patch occupying the median third of the costa. The apex is truncate, reaching more than half across the wing and there is a very small dark fuscous spot on costa at three-fourths, and a black dot or dash beneath it. There are also indications of blackish dots round the posterior part of the costa and termen. The hindwings are grey, becoming iridescent hyaline anteriorly.

References

acrotoma
Moths described in 1913
Moths of Asia